When Lights Are Low may refer to:
 "When Lights Are Low", a song composed by Benny Carter and Spencer Williams, 1936
 When Lights Are Low (Tony Bennett album), 1964
 When Lights Are Low (Claire Martin and Richard Rodney Bennett album), 2005
 When Lights Are Low (Kenny Burrell album), 1979